Parliamentary elections were held in Somaliland on 29 September 2005. They were  the first multiparty parliamentary election conducted in the country.

Electoral system
The 82 members of the House of Representatives were elected by open list proportional representation with the six multi-member constituencies based on the regions. The number of seats for each region was based on those used for the 1960 elections and multiplied by 2.5.

Campaign
At the time of the elections, the constitution limited the number of political parties to three:

Peace, Unity, and Development Party (Kulmiye) led by Ahmed Mohamed Mohamoud, the former President of Somaliland 
For Justice and Development (Ururka Caddaalada iyo Daryeelka, UCID) led by Faysal Ali Warabe
United Peoples' Democratic Party (Ururka dimuqraadiga ummadda bahawday, UDUB) led by Dahir Riyale Kahin, the former President of Somaliland

A total of 246 candidates contested the elections, including five women.

Conduct
A team of 76 observers from Canada, Finland, Kenya, South Africa, the United Kingdom, the United States and Zimbabwe monitored the polls. They described that the elections were conducted in a peaceful condition and were generally free and fair, nonetheless, the vote had fallen short of meeting several international standards.

Results

References

Somaliland
Elections in Somaliland
2005 in Somaliland